Robert Cooke (1768 – 22/23 August 1814) was an English organist and composer, from 1802 organist of Westminster Abbey.

Life

Cooke was born in Westminster, London, son of the organist and composer Benjamin Cooke; he succeeded his father as organist of the church of St Martin-in-the-Fields in 1793. He was  appointed organist at Westminster Abbey on the death of Samuel Arnold in 1802, and was master of the choristers of the Abbey by 1805.

On 22 or 23 August 1814 he drowned in the River Thames near Millbank; it was assumed to be suicide. He was buried in the west cloister of Westminster Abbey.

Compositions
Cooke wrote an Evening Service in C (1806), and a collection of chants for the choir of the Abbey. He also wrote an "Ode to Friendship", and several songs and glees, of which a collection of eight was published in 1805.

References

External links
 

1768 births
1814 deaths
English classical organists
British male organists
18th-century keyboardists
19th-century organists
Glee composers
19th-century classical composers
Master of the Choristers at Westminster Abbey
Burials at Westminster Abbey
19th-century British male musicians
Male classical organists